The Ministry of Public Safety and Security (MPSS) was an organization of the national government of South Korea with the responsibility of public safety and security. It was established on November 19, 2014 with a merger of the National Emergency Management Agency, Korea Coast Guard, a branch of Safety of Ministry of Security and Public Administration to prevent and efficiently respond to national disasters. It has its headquarters in the Seoul Government Complex.

Introduce
Vision : "A Safe Country, Happy People"
Target : People - Practicing safety in their daily lives / A Society - Embodying a culture of safety / National - Policies prioritizing safety 
Strategy 
Strengthen the disaster and safety control tower functions.
Improve the disaster responding capacity at the scene.
Propagate safety culture in everyday life.
Expand preventive infrastructures against disasters.
Creatively manage safety according to field.
Government 3.0 - new paradigm for government operation to deliver customized public services (https://web.archive.org/web/20161028140943/http://www.mpss.go.kr/en/gov/gov/)

Organization

History
1948. 11. 14 : Established the Fire Bureau in the Ministry of Home Affairs. 
1953. 12. 14 : Established the Korean Maritime Police Force in the Security Division of the Public Safety Bureau in the Ministry of Home Affairs.
1955. 02. 07 : Reorganized into the Marine Guards in the Maritime Business Agency of the Ministry of Commerce and Industry.
1962. 05. 05 : Reorganized into the Korean Maritime Police Force in the Ministry of Home Affairs.
1975. 08. 26 : Established the Headquarters of Civil Defense and the Fire Bureau in the Ministry of Home Affairs.
1991. 04. 23 : Established the Civil Defense Headquarters and the Fire Bureau within the Ministry of Home Affairs.
1991. 08. 01 : Inaugurated the Korea Coast Guard in the National Police Agency.
1996. 08. 08 : Reorganized the Korea Coast Guard under the Ministry of Oceans and Fisheries.
1998. 07. 22 : Reorganized into the Headquarters of Civil Defense and Disaster Management in the Ministry of Government Administration and Home Affairs.
2004. 06. 01 : Established the National Emergency Management Agency under the Ministry of Government Administration and Home Affairs.
2008. 02. 29 : Reorganized the Korea Coast Guard under the Ministry of Land, Transportation and Maritime Affairs. 
2013. 03. 23 : Expanded and reorganized into the Safety Management Headquarters in the Ministry of Security and Public Administration.
2014. 11. 07 : The revised bill for the National Government Organization Act (concerning the establishment of the Ministry of Public Safety and Security) passed by the National Assembly.
2014. 11. 19 : Established the Ministry of Public Safety and Security.

Important Roles
Innovating safety for a safe nation and happy people 
With the ‘Master Plan for Safety Innovation’ developed through public participation, the Ministry of Public Safety and Security has set up a standardized framework for disaster management and is pushing for 100 action plans based on 5 key strategies for a safer Korea. The ministry operates the ‘Safety Reporting Application’ which enables the people to directly report hazards in life and check on the improvements. Also by conducting the ‘Grand National Safety Examination’ we are transforming risk into safety. Furthermore, we are planning to offer customized life cycle-oriented safety education to everyone not just for the socially vulnerable groups such as the elderly and children.

 Safety Industry, Technology : We scrutinize the safety level in every corner of Korea and support the safety industry and technology. Wouldn’t you want to know whether where you live is safe from crime and disaster? MPSS creates safety maps customized for the people such as safe night roads for women and provide information to the public by making available GIS based maps from hazard information collected by public organizations. MPSS fosters the safety industry by supporting advanced safety technologies or products and increasing investments in public/private sectors. We also enhance response capabilities by actively adopting science technologies.
 Civil Defense, Elevator Safety : We operate the Civil Defense Corps for emergencies and set policies for the safe use of elevators. MPSS operates the Civil Defense Corps and Civil Defense Alert and Control Center to rapidly respond to national crises and prevent disasters. We have the accident investigation board to assist victims and issue recommendations aimed at preventing future accidents.

Saving Precious Lives protecting the blissful future of our people
 Fire Suppression · Rescue and Emergency Medical Services : We protect the lives and properties of the people from fires and dangers. On an average day, about 100 fire accidents occur, 300 people are rescued from distress and 4,600 patients are serviced by 119 in Korea. In order to protect the lives and properties of the people from fires and other hazards, MPSS upgrades firefighting gears to rapidly and precisely respond to incidents and enhances the professionalism of firefighters through continuous and repetitive exercises. By promoting preemptive fire prevention policies, we are creating an environment for the fire industry to advance are making, MPSS maintains a high quality system enabling patients all across the country to receive timely and proper emergency treatment and then be transferred to a hospital by 119 EMT services. 
 Maritime Search and Rescue Operations : We protect the precious lives of our people through preemptive response to maritime incidents. It is imperative to response within the golden time, the first hour in a maritime incident. To strengthen the initial response capabilities for maritime incidents, MPSS expanded Korea Coast Guard Special Rescue Unit and Maritime Rescue Teams and also increased its maritime rescue assets including large helicopters and speed boats. We are conducting intense full-scale SAR exercises to improve on-scene response capacity.
 Special Disaster Response : The Special Disaster Management Office was created to exclusively manage and respond to special disasters. The Special Disaster Management Office, launched to respond to special disasters involving large-scale traffic accidents, environmental pollution, infectious diseases, animal diseases, nuclear energy and information technology, analyzes the disaster response capabilities of relevant departments, monitors the situation and provide professional technical support. Furthermore, the Office is responsible for building partnerships with involved agencies such as domestic and international disaster related private organizations, societies, associations, research institutes and others, and also overseeing the general operation of the Government Disaster Cause Investigation Team.
 Protecting and preserving our waters adding hope to the sea
 Maritime Security : We will defend our maritime territory. We will increase the value of our ocean. For Korea, a country with territorial waters 4.5 times the land area, ensuring maritime sovereignty is the most important of all. 5 Regional Coast Guard Headquarters, 17 Coast Guard Stations and 9,000 Coast Guard men and women are vigilantly guarding our maritime territories including Dokdo and Ieodo and championing our maritime interests. By enforcing strong measures against foreign illegal fishing, we protect the livelihood of the fishermen who build the lives around the sea. We are also prepared against threats as terrorism through close-to-real exercises. Korea Coast Guard of the Ministry of Public Safety and Security considers protecting the sea as protecting the value of Korea and makes every effort in defending the maritime sovereignty of Korea. 
 Marine Pollution Response : Preserving the clean ocean is protecting hope. Protecting and preserving our clean ocean is protecting the hope of Korea. The Ministry of Public Safety and Security maintains a unified command system as the primary entity in charge of handling maritime pollution and strengthens the private-public military partnership to ensure perfect response within the golden time. We form the emergency response team for rapid containment of maritime pollution and to maintain a 24-hour response system. In order to improve national pollution control capabilities, we reinforced assets such as oil spill response vessels. We protect the clean sea by focusing on high risk areas to prevent pollution incidents from happening.
Prevent, Respond to and Recover from Disasters making Korea safe from disasters
 Control Natural Disasters and Societal Disasters : We operate the National Disaster and Safety Headquarters and cover all disasters. In the event of natural or societal disasters, the Ministry of Public Safety and Security has set a disaster response system that is immediately operational at the scene by unifying the disaster control system as the control tower and establishing a command system on scene. We will support the victims of unexpected disasters or accidents to return to their daily lives as soon as possible through field-oriented recovery assistance services. Also, we are building a preemptive disaster response system though integrating scientific situation management using advanced IT technologies, disaster communication networks and the National Disaster Management System (NDMS). The Ministry of Public Safety and Security is creating a country safe from disasters.
 Disaster reduction, Climate change, Earthquake prevention : We reduce disasters by taking preventive measures and tackle climate change, earthquakes and tsunamis. We push for early implementation of disaster prevention projects and carry out various interactive exercises to enable the public to respond to disasters and safety threats in everyday life by themselves. To prepare for various disasters including earthquakes and tsunamis, we develop manuals applicable in real situations and enhance response capacities through exercises. We also preemptively prepare for disasters by setting standards for and increasing the number of prevention facilities factoring in climate change. 
 National Disaster and Safety Control Center : We control crises around the clock. The place where the lights never go out 365 days a year. The place where situations all over the country are under control 24 hours a day. It is the National Disaster and Safety Control Center of Korea. To ensure a complete initial response to a situation as the nation’s crisis control tower, the National Disaster and Safety Control Center is operated in an integrated four-shift system. The center monitors in real time all information regarding natural/societal disasters occurring in land or at sea, the fire service, the police, the weather conditions and more. It also strengthens the collaborating system among relevant organizations against complex disasters.

Affiliated Organizations
 National Civil Defense and Disaster Management Training Institute
- The National Civil Defense and Disaster Management Training Institute(NDTI) is an educational training facility for the public officials and private professionals in the field of civil defense and disaster prevention. NDTI contributes to protecting the precious lives and properties of the people from various disasters by increasing response capabilities through task-oriented training programs.
 National Disaster Management Institute 
- The National Disaster Management Institute(NDMI) is the only comprehensive disaster research institute in Korea establishing a disaster response system based on science technology and social consensus. As ‘the leading global think tank in safety’, NDMI’s missions range from research and development of disaster management technologies to policy advancement and raising public awareness on safety.
 National Fire Service Academy
- The National Fire Service Academy is an education establishment imparting leadership and expertise to potential leaders of the firefighting future of Korea. The Academy trains firefighting personnel capable of rapidly responding to various disasters including massive complex disasters by offering pragmatic courses.
 National 119 Rescue Headquarters 
- Serving as the nation’s specialized organ for disaster response, the National 119 Rescue Headquarters equipped with an advanced response system and state-of-the-art gears, protects the lives and properties of the people by instantly deploying forces to national and international large-scale disaster scenes. 
 Korea Coast Guard Academy
- The Korea Coast Guard Academy located in Yeosu, one of the world’s four most beautiful port cities, is a world class all-around maritime education institution with cutting edge simulators training coast guard talents and offering a variety of hands-on marine education programs. 
 Regional Coast Guard Headquarters Coast Guard Stations(Central Regional·West Regional·East Regional·South·Jeju Regional Coast Guard  Headquarters)
 Korea Coast Guard Special Rescue Unit
- Korea Coast Guard Special Rescue Unit is equipped with high-tech equipment and advanced technologies and is immediately dispatched to the scene within the golden time in cases of large scale special maritime incidents, performing its duty of protecting the precious lives and properties of the people.
 Maintenance Center for Korea Coast Guard
- The Maintenance Center for Korea Coast Guard is responsible for the repairing of Coast Guard patrol ships to operate safely and conducts overall duties related to maintenance such as technical equipment education.

See also
Government of South Korea
Ministry of Security and Public Administration
United States Department of Homeland Security - similar organization in the U.S.
 Ministry of the Interior and Safety (South Korea)

References

Public communication channels of the MPSS 
MPSS Website 
MPSS English Website  
MPSS BLOG
MPSS FACEBOOK Page
MPSS TWITTER
PSS BROADCASTING
Applications for reporting threats to safety in life and looking up disaster/safety information
Safety Reporting (sinmungo)
-A service which enables you to report hazards in your everyday life anytime, anywhere.
Safety Stepping stone (didimdol)
-The official government disaster/safety information portal app servicing all information related to disasters from 112 and 119 hotline to local weather, hospitals and pharmacies.

Government ministries of South Korea
Public safety ministries